Watson Evans "Watty" Moore (30 August 1925 – 1967) was an English footballer for Hartlepool United. A one-club man, the centre-half held the all-time appearance record for Hartlepool for more than fifty years, making 472 starts for the club between 1948 and 1960. His record was overtaken by Ritchie Humphreys in 2011.

An amateur with Oxford Street Old Boys, he signed with Hartlepool United in 1948, at the age of 23. He started as a centre-forward, but converted to the centre-half position. He began on wages of £12 a week, and his mother attended every game in his career. He became club captain, and went on to make 472 appearances in all competitions, before retiring in 1960. He died from a heart attack at the age of 41.

Career statistics
All appearances made by Watty Moore:

References

1925 births
1967 deaths
Footballers from Hartlepool
English footballers
Association football defenders
Hartlepool United F.C. players
English Football League players